Ironside Glacier is a glacier, about  long, originating at the south side of Mount Minto in the Admiralty Mountains and draining southeast between Mount Whewell and Mount Herschel into Moubray Bay, Victoria Land, Antarctica. At its mouth it is joined by the Honeycomb Glacier flowing in from the north.

The name is suggested by an association of ideas involved in the name Admiralty Mountains, and by the impression of power given by the great icefall in the lower portion of the glacier. Named by the New Zealand Geological Survey Antarctic Expedition (NZGSAE), 1957–58.

See also
 List of glaciers in the Antarctic
 Glaciology

References

Admiralty Mountains
Glaciers of Borchgrevink Coast